× Aeridovanda, abbreviated in trade journals Aerdv, is an intergeneric hybrid between the orchid genera Aerides and Vanda (Aer x V). It is now the accepted name for several former hybrid genera, since Ascocentrum and Neofinetia are now both synonymous with Vanda.

References

Orchid nothogenera
Aeridinae